Granite is a town in Greer County, Oklahoma, United States. The population was 1,628 at the 2020 census.

Geography
Granite is located in eastern Greer County at  (34.962367, -99.381356). State Highways 6 and 9 intersect at the southern end of town; Highway 6 leads north  to Elk City and south  to Altus, while Highway 9 leads east  to Hobart and west then south  to Mangum.

Headquarters Mountain, elevation , rises  directly above the north side of town.

Demographics

As of the census of 2000, there were 1,844 people, 443 households, and 283 families residing in the town. There were 533 housing units at an average density of 337.1 per square mile (130.2/km2). The racial makeup of the town was 69.47% White, 16.97% African American, 4.93% Native American, 0.38% Asian, 3.85% from other races, and 4.39% from two or more races. Hispanic or Latino of any race were 7.16% of the population.

There were 443 households, out of which 27.1% had children under the age of 18 living with them, 48.8% were married couples living together, 10.4% had a female householder with no husband present, and 36.1% were non-families. 33.9% of all households were made up of individuals, and 18.1% had someone living alone who was 65 years of age or older. The average household size was 2.26 and the average family size was 2.88.

In the town, the population was spread out, with 13.7% under the age of 18, 12.6% from 18 to 24, 43.2% from 25 to 44, 18.3% from 45 to 64, and 12.2% who were 65 years of age or older. The median age was 36 years. For every 100 females, there were 259.5 males. For every 100 females age 18 and over, there were 304.8 males.

The median income for a household in the town was $25,438, and the median income for a family was $30,703. Males had a median income of $23,125 versus $20,368 for females. The per capita income for the town was $12,599. About 13.1% of families and 17.5% of the population were below the poverty line, including 23.0% of those under age 18 and 12.3% of those age 65 or over.

Local business
Situated at the foot of the Wichita Mountains, Granite is home to significant mining operations. Quarries such as Willis Granite Products extract native red granite for use in headstones, memorials and signs throughout the United States.

Granite is also home to Oklahoma State Reformatory, a medium-security corrections facility also boasting some maximum and minimum-security housing for adult male inmates. Located off Oklahoma Highway 9, the  facility has a maximum capacity of 999 inmates.

Notable person
 Mike Brumley, Major League Baseball catcher

References

External links
 Oklahoma Department of Corrections – Oklahoma State Reformatory
 CBS News: New Twist In Case Of Warden's Wife
 About.com: Marriage – Randy and Bobbi Parker Marriage Profile
 Encyclopedia of Oklahoma History and Culture - Granite
 Abandoned Oklahoma - Article and Photos of Granite
 Willis Granite Products

Towns in Greer County, Oklahoma
Towns in Oklahoma